PM is one of the Australian Broadcasting Corporation's flagship current affairs radio programs.  It is also one of Australia's longest-running productions, having been first aired on 7 July 1969. It is the sister program to AM.

As of September 2022, it is hosted by David Lipson and broadcast on Radio National and ABC Local Radio.

History and timeslots
PM was first broadcast in 1969 for what were then ABC Radio 1 and Radio 3 (now ABC Local Radio). Launched on 7 July 1969, two years after its sister programme AM, with both names created by ABC General Manager Talbot Duckmanton.

It aired every weekday at 6:10 pm (after the 6:00 pm news bulletin), becoming a popular afternoon radio current affairs programme. PM was later introduced to ABC Radio 2 (now ABC Radio National) with a new early edition at 5:10 pm after the 5:00 pm news. PM was originally 25 minutes long before expansion to 50 minutes in 1987. In 2018 it reduced to a half-hour format, which matched AM.

Description
PM complements AM and other ABC News and Current Affairs radio programs, namely The World Today and Correspondents Report.

 the programme is presented by David Lipson.

The ABC's streaming links and podcasts have allowed people to access and listen to PM programmes after their broadcast time.

Past presenters 
PMs first presenters were Lawrence Bryant and John Highfield, who hosted on alternate nights. Others presenters who have hosted the show include Iain Finlay, Paul Murphy (1983 to 1993), Monica Attard, and Ellen Fanning, and reporters Ray Martin, Bob Carr, Kate Baillieu, and Maxine McKew.

Mark Colvin hosted the program from 1997 until 2017. In December 2017, Linda Mottram was announced as the new host of PM. Some time after July 2019, Mottram was replaced by David Lipson.

Musical signature themes
The original 1967 signature was "Crossbeat", a 30-second electronic music piece sourced from the BBC, composed and realised by David Cain of the BBC Radiophonic Workshop. This was replaced by new themes for both AM and PM, composed by Tony Ansell in the 1980s, both based on a similar theme and performed in a similar manner on a synthesiser using a brass-type patch. The similarity between the themes represented a significant link between the sister programmes.

This music was used from the 1980s until January 2017.

References

External links
 

ABC News and Current Affairs
Australian Broadcasting Corporation radio programs
1969 establishments in Australia